Robert Picard de La Vacquerie (July 22, 1893 – March 17, 1969) was a French Catholic prelate who was the Bishop of Orléans from 1951 to 1963.

Biography 
Robert Picard de La Vacquerie was ordained a priest on June 29, 1921, and was first incardinated in the Archdiocese of Paris. In 1924, he was inducted into the Society of the History of Paris and the Île-de-France.

He was appointed the Titular Bishop of Doara on July 16, 1946, and was consecrated a bishop on October 9, 1946, with Cardinal Emmanuel Célestin Suhard acting as the principal consecrator. He then became the chaplain to the troops of the French-occupied zone of Germany and Austria between 1946 and 1951.

On August 27, 1951, he was named Bishop of Orléans. From 1952 to 1960, he was the bishop protector of the French Sports Federation "responsible for monitoring the activities [of the FSF] and encouraging the FSF apostolate."

He was a Conciliar Father at the first session of the Second Vatican Council, from October 11 to December 8, 1962.

Picard La Vacquerie resigned as Bishop of Orléans on May 23, 1963, and was appointed the Titular Archbishop of Amida on the same day.

He died on March 17, 1969, in Orléans, France, at the age of 75.

References

Notes

Bibliography

External links 
 Diocese of Orléans

1893 births
1969 deaths
20th-century Roman Catholic titular archbishops
Bishops of Orléans
20th-century French Roman Catholic bishops
People from Charenton-le-Pont
Participants in the Second Vatican Council